The Monégasque identity card or CIME is issued to Monégasque citizens by the Monaco City Hall. It can be used as a travel document when visiting countries in the Schengen Area (except Iceland and Sweden), the CEFTA states (except North Macedonia and Serbia) as well as  Andorra, Gibraltar, Romania and Montserrat (max.14 days). The card is produced for the Monaco City Hall by Oberthur Technologies.

Since 30 March 2009, Monégasque identity cards have been issued containing a biometric chip. Validity of the card is 5 years from the date of issue.

See also
Monégasque passport

References

Monaco